The Semovente L. 40 da 47/32 was an Italian self-propelled gun built during World War II. It was created by mounting a Cannone da 47/32 anti-tank gun in an open-topped, box-like superstructure on a L6/40 light tank chassis. Some were built as command tanks with a radio installed instead of the main gun. An 8 mm machine gun disguised as the 47 mm main gun was used on these versions to make them look like a regular Semovente 47/32s. About 300 Semoventi da 47/32 were built from 1941 onward. The Semovente da 47/32 was the most heavily armed Italian armoured fighting vehicle used on the Eastern Front.

While the 47 mm gun was adequate for 1941, by the time the Semovente reached the field it was already outdated and ineffective against enemy medium tanks, and therefore the vehicle was not particularly successful.

After the Italian armistice in September 1943, the German Army took all Semovente 47/32s they could get hold of for their own use. The German designation was StuG L6 47/32 630(i). Some of these were provided to Germany's Croatian puppet state and the Slovene Home Guard.

Variants
 Semovente L. 40 da 47/32: standard variant, carrying 70 rounds of ammunition in the hull and lacking a radio.
 Carro comando plotone per semovente da 47/32: platoon commander vehicle, equipped with a Marelli  radio set, at the expense of a reduced ammunition capacity (47 rounds). The main visual difference from the standard variant was a single radio aerial.
The main gun was removed to make room for the radio equipment; in its place there was an 8 mm Breda mod. 38 machine gun, disguised as a 47 mm gun. This variant had twin radio aerials as well as the mock gun barrel.

References
Notes

Bibliography

External links
Semovente 47/32 su L6/40 at wwiivehicles.com
 Semovente L40 da 47/32 Self-Propelled Gun

Armoured fighting vehicles of Italy
World War II armoured fighting vehicles of Italy
World War II self-propelled artillery
47 mm artillery
Gio. Ansaldo & C. armored vehicles
Military vehicles introduced from 1940 to 1944